Moshe Aviv Tower, is a  skyscraper located in the demarcated area of the Diamond Exchange District (Israel Diamond Exchange) on Jabotinsky Road (No. 7) in the Tel Aviv District city of Ramat Gan, Israel. The 68-story building is commonly known as City Gate, its original name. It is the second tallest building in Israel, following Tel Aviv's  Azrieli Sarona Tower.

Background
The building was designed by architects Amnon Niv and Amnon Schwartz. It was named after Moshe Aviv, the owner of the construction company, who died in an accident in October 2001, before its completion.

Construction
The design for City Gate was inspired by the famous Westend Tower in Frankfurt. Construction on the tower began in 1998 and was completed in 2003 when the tower became occupied. The construction period was extremely short, achieving a sequence of five stories per month with only one shift of 40 workers. Total cost of construction was US$133 million. The building appeared in a TV advertisement for the Mifal HaPayis national lottery before it was completed, in December 2002. When completed it is the most expensive single building in Israel.

There is now an approved plan for a similar tower of the same height, the Elite Tower, across Jabotinsky Road, on the current site of the Elite Factory.

Use
The Moshe Aviv Tower is a multi-use structure. Below that, the bulk of the tower contains  of office space. Separate lobbies and elevators serve the residential and office sections.  of commercial space occupies the lower floors. There is a synagogue on the third floor for residents, office tenants and visitors. The rooftop of the cylinder part serves as an emergency helipad. The tower also boasts an exclusive fitness club and swimming pool situated on the tower's carpark annex roof.

On September 27, 2004, as part of the annual global City in Pink lighting campaign for breast cancer, the building was lit completely in bright pink light.

Gallery

See also
List of skyscrapers in Israel
List of tallest buildings in the world
Architecture in Israel

References

External links

 

Skyscraper office buildings in Israel
Commercial buildings completed in 2003
Buildings and structures in Ramat Gan
Residential skyscrapers in Israel